Roman Katsman (born 1969) is an Israeli professor and researcher of Hebrew and Russian literature. He is Full Professor of the Department of Literature of the Jewish People in Bar-Ilan University.

Biography

Katsman was born in Zhitomir (Ukraine) on November 26, 1969. He has lived in Israel since 1990. He earned his Ph.D. (cum laude) from Bar-Ilan University in 1999. The title of his dissertation was "Mythopoesis: Theory, Method and Application in the Selected Works by Dostoevsky and Agnon." Since 2000, Katsman has taught in the Department of Literature of the Jewish People in Bar-Ilan University. From 2014 to 2017, he served as the Head of the Department. Katsman is married and has two children.

Research

Mythopoesis 
Katsman's first book, The Time of Cruel Miracles
(2002), is dedicated to developing a theory of mythopoesis, that is, how myth is
created through the act of reading the literary text. Myth is defined
(following Alexei Losev) as a miraculous history of personality given in words
(the miracle in this case being perceived as the realization of the
personality's transcendental purpose in empirical history). Based on Emmanuel Levinas' concept of revelation, a theory is proposed in which mythopoesis is
seen as the personality's becoming towards its miracle in an ethical
face-to-face encounter with another personality. A method for the study of
literary mythopoesis is constructed on the foundation of this theory of
mythopoesis.

Chaos theory 
This project continues in the direction of a
theory of the literary figure as a mythopoeic personality. A dialogue with the René Girard and Eric Gans anthropological-philosophical theories has been
developed, according to which a sign (in language and culture in general) is
created in an originary scene of violence or prevention of violence towards a
central personality (the victim), as a substitute for it. In this research, Girard's
and Gans' theory is complemented with a theory of mythopoesis, according to
which the personality's transformation into a sign is accompanied by a
simultaneous process whereby the sign is transformed into a personality (this
is the process of myth-creation). The two processes are treated as unified and
feeding each other within a complex dynamic system. The system is then examined
in terms of chaos theory. The discussion leads to the conclusion that the
figure's origination is a chaotic system, characterized also by features of an
autopoetic (living) system, in terms of the Humberto Maturana and Francisco Varela biological-cognitive theory. The book Poetics of Becoming
(2005) is dedicated to this research, in which the theory of mythopoesis in its
expanded form is examined through the works of Hebrew and Russian writers,
including Agnon, Amos Oz, Meir Shalev, Orly Castel-Bloom, Etgar Keret, Dostoevsky, Mikhail Bulgakov, and Osip Mandelstam.
The works by Isaac Babel and Mandelstam are discussed in the context of multi-culturalism and
bi-national literature, leading to a new definition of Jewish-Russian
literature.

Gestures 
The book At the Other End of Gesture
(2008) is devoted to the problem of gestures (body language) in literature.
Based on recent advances in the modern science of gesture (Adam Kendon, David McNeill, Uri Hadar and others) a cognitive model is constructed of the
processing of gestures in the course of reading a literary text, and a method
is developed for an interdisciplinary study of the representation of gesture
in text, from poetic, cultural, anthropological and semiological aspects. A
series of discussions concerning the poetics of gesture in the writings of a
number of modern Hebrew writers (Uri Nissan Gnessin, Isaac Dov Berkowitz, Yeshayahu Bershadsky, Gershon Shofman,
Agnon, Jacob Steinberg, Etgar Keret, Judith Katzir, Meir Shalev, Aharon Appelfeld, Dorit Rabinyan) leads
to far-reaching conclusions concerning their poetics and concerning the
philosophy of gesture in modern culture. This study also examines how gesture
functions as anthropological motive for creating art, and as one of the
mechanisms whereby symbolism is created.

Some studies which have not been included in
the last book are the following: spontaneous gestures in the Bible; gestures
accompanying the reading/learning of the Torah among Yemenite Jews (a study at
the crossroads between the science of gesture, visual anthropology and the
anthropology of the body); a study on gestural practices in Jewish religious life; studies on gesture in the writings of Milorad Pavić as the key to his
poetics (in his two major novels, Dictionary of the Khazars and Landscape Painted with Tea); a study on gesture in Dostoevsky's The Idiot in relation to the theme of man/body as machine.

Sincerity 
A Small Prophecy (2013) is a
theoretical and applied research of sincerity as rhetorical and cultural,
lingual and anthropological category. Sincerity and rhetoric provide two ways
for constituting a personality (subject, identity, character) in the speech. They
complement each other till their complete confluence in the intention of
persuasion. Two opposite conceptions of sincerity – as genuine self-expression
and as artificial "theatrical" performance – are presented as not effective,
especially in such complex cultural phenomena as S.Y. Agnon's work. In the
first part of the research, the analysis of sincere speech as rhetorical act
leads to discussion of the rhetoric itself and to its repositioning in cultural-spiritual
practice. By this course, the concept of cultural-communal rhetoric of
sincerity has been shaped, which is applied to resolving the intricate problems
roused within Agnon studies, particularly the problem of author's sincerity in
representation of miracle, his religious or anti religious intentions. In the
second part, the Book One of 'Ir u-mlo'a is discussed,  focusing on the Agnon rhetoric and on what is
called "Agnon's lessons in rhetoric and sincerity". The analysis brings out
that Agnon's impossible, multi-intentional discourse on "the impossible" is
aimed to scrutinize the realized possibilities of the historical existence of
the Jewish community (on the scale from Buchach to the People of Israel), and
to create new, not realized possibilities – the most mythic and true ones.

Alternative history 
The book Literature, History, Choice
(2013) deals with one of the most popular subjects in the recent literature and
cinematography – alternative (counterfactual, allo-history). Alternative history
is not merely the definition of a historiographic method and of a subgenre of
fantasy literature, but it is rather also a poetic and hermeneutical principle.
One may discover foundations of the alternative history principle in works that
have no connection at all to fantasy genres. In this case, one must speak of
the poetics of historical alternative. Even when the work makes no overt use of
the poetics of historical alternativity, the principle of historical
alternativity can be used as a method of reading, that is, as a hermeneutic
principle, which is used to reveal implicit historiographical and historical
perceptions on which the poetics and ideology of the work are based. What makes
it possible to speak of alternative history in such a sweeping sense is the
observation that alternative history is not just oscillation between different
histories but rather oscillation between alternative elements at four levels:
myth (plot); personality (identity); choice (perception of history), and mode
of choice (historiographical view). The mechanism of oscillation is identical
at all of the levels and it consists of a return to the point of bifurcation in
the past and a free choice of the new future. However, at every level, the
historical, ethical, cultural and personalistic significance of the oscillation
is different because at every level, different elements may be chosen. Thus,
analysis of an implicit historical and historiographical discourse, which
underlies every work of literature, is carried out using a multi-layered
method.

The main point is that oscillation at each of
these levels is what establishes the choice, as well as the subject and object
of that choice. Without oscillation between unrealized possibilities, there can
be no myth, no personality, no history, and no historiography. The oscillation
does not happen after the poles of oscillation have been determined but is in
fact what creates them. This oscillation is what creates the alternatives and
not the other way around. Rhetoric is the internal mechanism that creates oscillation,
and thus – creates the historical alternativity. To speak of alternative
history is to speak of a mechanism for establishing meaning – of narrative, of
personality, of memory, and of writing. Based on this, establishing meaning is
a historical and personalistic creation, and thus it is an act of establishing
ethics and of establishing truth.

Alternative history as a genre, as well as
the principle of historical alternativity, is based on the implicit (and
largely unconscious) metaphysical premise of the existence of a historical
truth and of the possibility of proving it. Therefore this principle is not a
postmodern or relativistic element but rather the opposite is true: alternative
history was intended to repair the damage caused to culture by radical
relativism which is characteristic of certain periods and ideologies,
particularly postmodernism.

Agnon's oeuvre, and Ir u-meloa (The Cityand All It Has in It) in particular, is presented then as a classic example
not only of historical writing but also of the poetics of historical alternativity.  This research method is applied to Agnon's
work in order to understand the complex philosophical-historical perceptions of
the author. Both the theoretical analysis and the analysis of the works show
that the nucleus of historical alternativity contains the question: "How does
one choose?" or in other words, "How does one write (history)?" – this is the
dilemma where oscillation between different historiographical perceptions
unites with oscillation between different perceptions of writing on the one
hand, and with oscillation between different ethical perceptions (i.e.
concerning identity, memory, responsibility) on the other.

 Russian literature in Israel 
The book Nostalgia for a Foreign Land (2016) focuses on the last two and half decades of the history of Russian literature in Israel, and particularly on several novelists among many who immigrated to Israel with the "big wave" of repatriation in 1990s, and whose largest part of the works was written in Israel: Dina Rubina, Nekoda Singer, Elizaveta Mikhailichenko and Yuri Nesis, and Mikhail Yudson. They are popular and active authors on the Israeli scene, in the printed and electronic media. Singer and Yudson are also editors of the renowned journals and authors of literary and cultural reviews and essays. In spite of the evident differences in their styles, lingual and aesthetic visions, these five writers are united by the same essential feature: free play of the Jewish-Russian mentality, Jewish-Israeli identity, and Russian-Israeli culture. They search for the new indigeneity and find it in the metaphysical nomadism, multiplicity, network, or untranslatability. They constitute a new generation of Jewish-Russian writers: diasporic Russians and (pseudo-)indigenous Israelis.

Publications
 Books 
 Nostalgia for a Foreign Land: Studies in Russian-Language Literature in Israel. Series: Jews of Russia and Eastern Europe and Their Legacy. Brighton MA: Academic Studies Press, 2016. 
 Literature, History, Choice: The Principle of Alternative History in Literature (S.Y. Agnon, The City with All That is Therein). Cambridge Scholars Publishing, 2013. 
 A Small Prophecy: Sincerity and Rhetoric in Ir u-meloa by S.Y. Agnon, in Hebrew, Bar-Ilan University Press, 2013.
 At the Other End of Gesture. Anthropological Poetics of Gesture in Modern Hebrew Literature, Begengung: Jüdische Studien, Frankfurt am Main, Peter Lang GmbH, 2008. 
 Poetics of Becoming: Dynamic Processes of Mythopoesis in Modern and Postmodern Hebrew and Slavic Literature, Heidelberg University Publications in Slavistics, Frankfurt am Main, Peter Lang GmbH, 2005. 
 The Time of Cruel Miracles: Mythopoesis in Dostoevsky and Agnon, Heidelberg University Publications in Slavistics, Frankfurt am Main, Peter Lang GmbH, 2002. 

 Edited 
 Around the Point: Studies in Jewish Literature and Culture in Multiple Languages, ed. by Hillel Weiss, Roman Katsman, and Ber Kotlerman, Cambridge Scholars Publishing, 2014.

 The Parallel Universes of David Shrayer-Petrov: A Collection Published on the Occasion of the Writer's 85th Birthday, ed. Roman Katsman, Maxim D. Shrayer, Klavdia Smola. Boston: Academic Studies Press, 2021.

 Parallel'nye vselennye Davida Shraera-Petrova: Sbornik statei i materialov k 85-letiiu pisatelia, ed. Roman Katsman, Klavdia Smola, Maxim D. Shrayer. St. Petersburg: Academic Studies Press/Bibliorossica, 2021.

 Articles 
 Crisis of the Victimary Paradigm in Contemporary Russian Literature in Israel (An applied case study of Eric Gans's Generative Anthropology), Anthropoetics: The Journal of Generative Anthropology, XXIV, no. 1 Fall 2018.
'Parallelnye vselennye Davida Shraera-Petrova' (The Parallel Universes of David Shrayer-Petrov), Wiener Slawistischer Almanach, 79 (2017), pp. 255-279.
Jewish fearless speech: towards a definition of Soviet Jewish nonconformism (F. Gorenshtein, F. Roziner, D. Shrayer-Petrov), East European Jewish Affairs, 48 (1), 2018, pp. 41-55.
 "Freakish Sacrifices": The Problem of Victimhood in Alexander Goldstein's Novel Quiet Fields (in Russian). Novoe literaturnoe obozrenie (New literary observer), 150 (2/2018), pp. 271-289.
 Stam: The Unbearable Lightness of Banality, or On the Nature of Etgar Keret's Humor,' Ben-Gurion University Review, Winter 2018.
'Krizis viktimnoj paradigmy. Sluchaj noveishej russko-izrailskoj literatury' (Crisis of Victimary Paradigm. A Case of Russian Literature in Israel). In RUSYCYSTYCZNE STUDIA LITERATUROZNAWCZE, # 27: Russian Literature and the Jewish Question, ed. Mirosława Michalska-Suchanek and Agnieszka Lenart. Katowice: Wydawnictwo Uniwersytetu Śląskiego, 2017, pp. 9-28.
 How Is Myth Possible? The Question of Shaping of the Historical-Personalistic Conception of Myth (Matvei Kagan and Mikhail Gershenson, 1919-1922) (in Russian), Issledovaniia po istorii russkoj mysli (Studies in Russian Intellectual History), 2017, pp. 513-538.
 Fearless Vulnerability of Nonconformism (I. Gabay, M. Grobman, G. Sapgir) (in Russian), Toronto Slavic Quarterly, # 59 (2017). 
 Philosophy of Freedom in the Novel by Dennis Sobolev Jerusalem (in Russian), Studia Slavica Academiae Scientiarum Hungaricae, 62:2 (2017), pp. 459-474.
 Jerusalem: A Dissipative Novel by Dennis Sobolev (in Russian), Novoe literaturnoe obozrenie (New literary review), 143 (1/2017), pp. 291-312. 
 "The Parable and Its Lesson" by S. Y. Agnon and the Thinking of Historical Alternativeness,' (in Hebrew), Mikan, 17 (2017), pp. 340-356.
 'Eric Gans' Thinking of Origin, Culture, and of the Jewish Question vis-a-vis Hermann Cohen's Heritage,' Journal of Jewish Thought and Philosophy, 23, 2015, pp. 236-255.
 'Network and Sacrifice in the Novel I/e_rus.olim by Elizaveta Mikhailichenko and Yury Nesis,' Toronto Slavic Quarterly, 54 (2015), pp. 27-49.
 'Nekod Singer in Russian and Hebrew: Neoeclectism And Beyond', Symposium: A Quarterly Journal in Modern Literatures, 70:2, 2016, pp. 66-79.
 'The Blue Altay: The Unknown Manuscripts of Avraam Vysotsky and the Genesis of the Novel Saturday and Sunday,' (in Russian), Toronto Slavic Quarterly, 56 (Spring 2016).
 'Kotesh Grisin: The Alternative History of Agnon ('Ha-mevakshim lahem rav,' Ir u-Meloa),' (in Hebrew), Dappim le-Mekhkar be-Sifrut, 19, 2014, pp. 7-43.
 'The Speech of Yakov Maze in Honor of Hermann Cohen,' (in Russian), translation and preface by Roman Katsman, in Issledovaniya po istorii russkoy mysli, vol. 10, Edited by Modest A. Kolerov and Nikolay S. Plotnikov, Moscow, Modest Kolerov, 2014, pp. 465-478.
 'Boris Pasternak's Doctor Zhivago in the Eyes of the Israeli Writers and Intellectuals (A Minimal Foundation of Multilingual Jewish Philology),' in Around the Point: Studies in Jewish Multilingual Literature, ed. Hillel Weiss, Roman Katsman, Ber Kotlerman, Cambridge Scholars Publishing, 643-686.
 'Etgar Keret: The Minimal Metaphysical Origin.' Symposium: A Quarterly Journal in Modern Literatures, vol. 67, 2013, pp. 189-204.
 'Jewish Traditions: Active Gestural Practices in Religious Life,' Body-Language-Communication. An International Handbook on Multimodality in Human Interaction, ed. by Cornelia Müller, Alan Cienki, Ellen Fricke, Silva H. Ladewig, David McNeill, Sedinha Tessendorf. Series of Handbooks of Linguistics and Communication Sciences. Berlin-New York, Mouton de Gruyter, 2013, 320-329.
 'Mordecai at the King's Gate: A Few Introductory Remarks to Matvei Kagan's 'Vom Begriff der Geschichte' (On the Concept of History),' in Eastern European Jewish Literature of the 20th and 21st Centuries: Identity and Poetics. Ed. by Klavdia Smola. Series: Die Welt der Slaven. München – Berlin – Washington/D.C., Verlag Otto Sagner, 2013, pp. 403-406.
 (As editor): Matvej Kagan. "Vom Begriff der Geschichte." Briefe: Simon Gulko – Matvej Kagan." In: Eastern European Jewish Literature of the 20th and 21st Centuries: Identity and Poetics. Series: Die Welt der Slaven. Ed. by Klavdia Smola. München – Berlin – Washington/D.C., Verlag Otto Sagner, 2013, pp. 406-432.
 'Miracle, Sincerity and Rhetoric in the Writing of S.Y. Agnon' (in Hebrew), Ma'ase Sippur: Studies in Jewish Prose, vol. 3, ed. by Avidov Lipsker and Rella Kushelevsky, Ramat-Gan, Bar Ilan University Press, 2013, pp. 307-332.
 'Matvei Kagan: Judaism and the European Cultural Crisis,' Journal of Jewish Thought & Philosophy, 21 (2013), pp. 73-103.
 'Love and Bewilderment: Matvei Kagan's Literary Critical Concepts,' Partial Answers. Journal of Literature and the History of Ideas, 11:1 (2013), pp. 9-28.
 'Sincerity, Rhetoric and Representation of Miracle in Literature' (in Hebrew), Mi'kan 12 (2012), pp. 126-143.
 (With Ber Kotlerman), 'Mordechai Nisan Kagan: Peretz un di folks-mytologie' (Peretz and Mythology), Les Cahiers Yiddish / Yidishe Heftn 168, 2012, pp. 3-7.
 'Cultural Rhetoric, Generative Anthropology, and Narrative Conflict,' Anthropoetics 17, no. 2 (2012).
 (With Ber Kotlerman), 'Mordechai Nisan Kagan (Matvei Isaevich Kagan): Der Fargesener Russish-Yidisher Neo-Kantianer,' preface to: Matvei Kagan, 'Ivan Sergeevich Turgenev,' (in Yiddish), Yerushalaimer Almanac 29 (2012), pp. 433-442.
 The Unrealized Cantors: The Community Rhetoric of S. Y. Agnon' (in Hebrew), Ayin Gimel: A Journal of Agnon Studies, vol. 2, 2012, pp. 131-137.
 'From Buchach to Talpiot: On the Book of Dan Laor S. Y. Agnon (2008)', (in Hebrew), Cathedra, 140, 2011, pp. 180-183.
 'The Brit of Historical Remembrance', Zmanim, (in Hebrew), 116, 2011, pp. 111- 113.
 'S.Y. Agnon's Community Rhetoric: The heroism and crisis of power in two tales of gabbais (treasurers) from 'Ir U-meloah (The City and All it Has in It)', Hebrew Studies, 52, 2011, pp. 363-378.
 'To Read by Body: Gesture Studies in Culture and Literature' (in Hebrew), Ma'ase Sippur: Studies in Jewish Prose, vol. 2, ed. by Avidov Lipsker and Rella Kushelevsky, Bar Ilan University Press, 2009, pp. 373-404.
 'Gesture in Literature: Cognitive Processing and Cultural Semiosis (Case Study in Agnon's Stories)', (in Hebrew), Mekhkarey Yerushalaim be-sifrut ivrit (The  Studies in Hebrew Literature), 22 (2008), pp. 407-436.
 'The Problem of Spontaneous Gestures in the Bible. A Case Study of Gestural Poetics', (in Hebrew), Mikan 9 (2008), pp. 80-96.
 'An Invisible Gesture of A Jester: Body and Machine in The Idiot by F.M. Dostoevsky', Toronto Slavic Quarterly 26 (2008).
 'Poetics of Gestures in the Writing of Milorad Pavic (Dictionary of Khazars)' (in Hebrew), Dappim: Research in Literature 16-17, 2007-2008, pp. 383-400.
 'Gestures Accompanying Torah Learning/Recital Among Yemenite Jews', Gesture: The International Journal for the Interdisciplinary Study of Gestures and Nonverbal Communication (John Benjamins Publishing), 7:1 (2007), pp. 1-19.
 'The Dance of Myths: Mythopoesis and Narrative Ethics', (in Hebrew), Ma'ase Sippur: Studies in Jewish Prose, vol. 1, ed. by Avidov Lipsker and Rella Kushelevsky, Bar Ilan University Press, 2005, pp. 431-446.
 'Anthropoetic Gesture. A Key to Milorad Pavić's Poetics (Landscape Painted with Tea)', Toronto Slavic Quarterly 12 (2005).
 'The Memory of the Body: The Novel-Myth by Meir Shalev Be'veito Be'midbar', (in Hebrew), Dappim: Research in Literature, vol. 14-15, 2005, pp. 269-291.
 'Personality, Ethics and Ideology in the Postmodern Mythopoesis by Etgar Keret' (in Hebrew), Mi'kan, 4 (January 2005), pp. 20-41.
 'The Myth of Myth-Creation in Ido ve-Eynam by Agnon', (in Hebrew), Criticism & Interpretation (Bar Ilan University), 35-36 (2002), pp. 231-245.
 'The Miracle of Literature: An Ethical-Aesthetical Theory of Mythopoesis', Analecta Husserliana LXXV (2002), pp. 211-231.
 'Personal-Historical Conception of Myth in Forevermore by Agnon' (in Hebrew), Alei-Siah 45 (Summer 2001), pp. 53-63.
 'Generative Anthropology in the Works by Agnon' (in Hebrew), Proceedings of the 13 Congress of the World for Jewish Studies, 2001.
 'Dostoevsky's A Raw Youth: Mythopoesis as the Dialectics of Absence and Presence', The Dostoevsky Journal: An Independent Review 1 (2000), pp. 85-95.
 'Crime and Punishment: Face to Face' (in Russian), Dostoevsky i mirovaja kultura/Dostoevsky and the World Culture, N. 12 (1999), pp. 165-176.

 Translations 
Into Russian
 Shmuel Yosef Agnon, 'Poka ne pridiot Elijahu,' ('Ad she-yavo Elijahu'), trans. and afterword by Roman Katsman, Ierusalimsky zhurnal, 48 (2014), pp. 155–170. https://web.archive.org/web/20141029070558/http://magazines.russ.ru/ier/2014/48/
 Shmuel Yosef Agnon, 'Iz polskikh skazochnykh istoriy,' (Sipurei Polin), trans. and afterword by Roman Katsman, Ierusalimsky zhurnal, 52 (2015), pp. 185–198.
 Miron Izakson, 'Poems', Artikl, 29 (2015).

Into Hebrew
 David Shrayer-Petrov, Mivkhar shirim, trans. from Russian by Roman Katsman, Megaphone, http://megafon-news.co.il/asys/archives/186500.

 References 

 External links 
 Personal page on the site of Department of Literature of the Jewish People.
 ResearchGate
 Academia.edu
 Nostalgia for a Foreign Land : Studies in Russian-Language Literature in Israel on the site of Academic Studies Press.
 Literature, History, Choice on the site of Cambridge Scholars Publishing.
 A Small Prophecy on the site of Bar-Ilan University Press.
 Around the Point on the site of Cambridge Scholars Publishing.
 At the Other End of Gesture on the site of Peter Lang.
 Poetics of Becoming on the site of Peter Lang.
 The Time of Cruel Miracles'' on the site of Peter Lang.

1969 births
Living people
Israeli critics
Academic staff of Bar-Ilan University
Bar-Ilan University alumni